Igors Tarasovs (born 16 October 1988) is a Latvian footballer, who plays for Ypsonas FC and is also a member of Latvia national football team.

Club career

As a youth player Tarasovs played for JFC Skonto and was taken to the first team in 2006. Making just one first team appearance, he was soon loaned out to the unofficial Skonto Riga farm-team Olimps/RFS to get playing practice. During his loan spell from 2007 to 2008 Tarasovs played 50 matches and scored 2 goals. He returned to Skonto in 2009, becoming a first eleven player. Representing the club for 3 years Tarasovs made 84 league appearances and scored eleven goals, becoming the Latvian champion in 2010 and the Baltic League champion in 2011. In 2011, the fans voted him as the Skonto Riga Player of the Season.

At the start of 2012 Tarasovs refused to extend his contract with Skonto and went on trials with Jagiellonia Białystok in Poland, Inter Baku in Azerbaijan and 1. FC Tatran Prešov in Slovakia. On 15 February Tarasovs signed a contract with the Azerbaijan Premier League club Simurq PFC until the end of the season, joining his international team-mate Andrejs Rubins. Tarasovs scored 3 goals in 14 games that season, helping his team secure a place in the top tier for the upcoming season.

In July 2012 Tarasovs returned to Latvia, signing a contract with the Latvian Higher League club FK Ventspils. Throughout two seasons with the club he scored 8 goals in 37 league matches and helped the team win the championship and the Latvian Football Cup in 2013. Tarasovs also participated in the UEFA Champions League and the UEFA Europa League qualifying matches.

Tarasovs went on trials with Baník Ostrava and Bodø/Glimt in the Czech Republic and Norway, but eventually signed a contract with the Belarusian Premier League club Neman Grodno in February 2014. On 22 March 2014 Tarasovs scored the winning goal for Neman in the extra-time of Belarusian Cup 1/4 final match against BATE Borisov, securing his team a 2–1 victory and a place in the semi-finals. He scored in the 100th minute, beating his international team-mate Germans Māliņš in the BATE Borisov goal.

On 27 November 2014 Tarasovs signed a one-year contract with the Polish Ekstraklasa club Jagiellonia Białystok with an option to extend for two more seasons.

On 7 July he signed a contract with Śląsk Wrocław.

On 9 August 2019 it was confirmed, that Tarasovs had joined FK Spartaks Jūrmala.

International career

Tarasovs was a regular player for Latvia U-21 from 2008 to 2010. He scored once in 8 appearances. Tarasovs was firstly called up for Latvia international squad for a friendly match against Angola on 3 March 2010. He made his debut then coming on as a replacement for Vitālijs Astafjevs in the 73rd minute.

International goals
Scores and results list Latvia's goal tally first.

References

External links
 
 
 
 
 

1988 births
Living people
Footballers from Riga
Latvian footballers
Latvian people of Russian descent
Latvia international footballers
Latvian expatriate footballers
Skonto FC players
JFK Olimps players
Simurq PIK players
FK Ventspils players
FC Neman Grodno players
Jagiellonia Białystok players
Giresunspor footballers
Śląsk Wrocław players
FK Spartaks Jūrmala players
Kaposvári Rákóczi FC players
Kuopion Palloseura players
SC Kuopio Futis-98 players
Ethnikos Achna FC players
FK Liepāja players
Latvian Higher League players
Azerbaijan Premier League players
Belarusian Premier League players
Ekstraklasa players
TFF First League players
Nemzeti Bajnokság I players
Expatriate footballers in Azerbaijan
Expatriate footballers in Belarus
Expatriate footballers in Poland
Expatriate footballers in Turkey
Expatriate footballers in Hungary
Expatriate footballers in Finland
Expatriate footballers in Cyprus
Latvian expatriate sportspeople in Azerbaijan
Latvian expatriate sportspeople in Poland
Latvian expatriate sportspeople in Turkey
Latvian expatriate sportspeople in Hungary
Association football midfielders